TJ Morris Ltd is a British company that owns several businesses, including the discount store chains Home Bargains and Quality Save.

Home Bargains
The current slogan for Home Bargains is 'Top Brands, Bottom Prices'.

Quality Save

TJ Morris is currently the main owner of the discount chain Quality Save.

References

Retail companies of the United Kingdom
Companies based in Liverpool